Eutetrapha sedecimpunctata is a species of beetle in the family Cerambycidae. It was described by Victor Motschulsky in 1860, originally under the genus Saperda. It is known from North Korea, Russia, Japan, and China.

Subspecies
 Eutetrapha sedecimpunctata australis Takakuwa & Hirokawa, 1998
 Eutetrapha sedecimpunctata sedecimpunctata (Motschulsky, 1860)

References

Saperdini
Beetles described in 1860